World Miss University is an international beauty contest  held annually in Seoul, Korea since 1986, with an average of about 70 contestants every year. The event is to select World Miss University Peace Corp Representatives.

This event was organized by the International Association of University Presidents. After the United Nations named 1986 the Year of Peace, the organizing committee dispatched peace missions to regions in conflict like Kosovo and Rwanda. These days, the event is organized by the World Miss University Organizing Committee which has headquarter in Manhattan, New York, United States.

Winners

Countries by number of title wins

Winners Gallery

List of runners-up

Continental Awards

See also
 List of beauty contests

References

External links
 World Miss University official website

 
Beauty pageants in South Korea
Recurring events established in 1986
1986 establishments in South Korea
Annual events in South Korea
International beauty pageants